The Glasgowbury Music Festival was an annual music festival held in Draperstown, County Londonderry, Northern Ireland running from 2000 - 2013.

History
The Glasgowbury Music Festival made its first appearance in the summer of 2000 as a gathering of local bands, acts and showcases to raise awareness for the local charity, the Ulster Cancer Foundation. The event was co-ordinated by  singer/songwriter Paddy Glasgow and the event is named after him. The name is a play on Glastonbury Festival. Since its foundation in 2000, the festival has grown in popularity, and with each year, the event draws a significantly larger crowd than the previous year.  By 2008, the festival had expanded to four separate stages with several areas allocated to traders, small businesses, and entertainment. In recent years the event has enjoyed media coverage, with BBC Radio Foyle and RTÉ 2FM having broadcast live throughout the day. Music journalists from various magazines such as Alternative Ulster and Hot Press have also been in attendance. Fans are invited to camp at the festival, with ground set aside to accommodate those who wish to do so. The 2012 festival will see the implementation of six stages with a headline performance from Therapy? alongside The Japanese Popstars, Fighting With Wire, LaFaro, Axis Of, Paddy Nash & The Happy Enchiladas, Enemies, The Man Whom, Silhouette and many more. There will also be a comedy tent, village area and dedicated kids activities running throughout the day atop the stunning Eagle's Rock location.

Glasgowbury has since become a registered charity and made the move to the Cornstore in 2014, with the aim of providing entertainment and accessible tuition to the rural community at an affordable and accessible price. Since the move to the cornstore, Glasgowbury has gone on to become a registered OCN teaching centre and still hold many gigs such as the Sunday Unplugged and even continuing the ever popular G-Sessions.

Lineups

Awards

References

External links 

Glasgowbury Music Festival

Music festivals in Northern Ireland
Recurring events established in 2000
County Londonderry
2000 establishments in Northern Ireland
Annual events in Northern Ireland